T-Blades are a type of hockey skate blade manufactured by the German company T-Blade . Unlike tradition skate blades, T-blades are replaced when worn out. The manufacturer of the T-Blade states that "Compared to conventional skate blades, the T-Blade runner lasts 4-5 times longer." The T-Blade is held to the skate chassis by a stabilizer and six screws which require a special three-pronged wrench. The blades are sold pre-sharpened. Jochen Hecht of the Buffalo Sabres, Dennis Seidenberg of the New York Islanders, Marcel Goc of the Nashville Predators, and Christian Ehrhoff of the Buffalo Sabres are NHL players who use T-Blade skates.

References

Ice skates
Ice hockey equipment